Christos Constandinidis (born 10 May 1965) is a Greek weightlifter. He competed in the men's lightweight event at the 1988 Summer Olympics.

References

1965 births
Living people
Greek male weightlifters
Olympic weightlifters of Greece
Weightlifters at the 1988 Summer Olympics
Place of birth missing (living people)
20th-century Greek people